USS Thetis has been the name of more than one United States Navy ship, and may refer to:

, a steamer in commission in 1884 and from 1887 to 1897
, a patrol vessel in commission from 1917 to 1919
, a United States Coast Guard patrol craft in commission from 1931 to 1947 that was commissioned in the US Navy from 1941 to 1945 as USS Thetis

See also

United States Navy ship names